Zaldívar (originally Basque Zaldibar) is a Spanish/French family name of Basque origin. Zaldi, meaning "horse" and Ibar, meaning valley. Zaldivar, means "valley of horses".

People with this surname include:
Diego de Zaldívar y Fernández, Condado de Saucedilla, Almirante de la Flota de Nueva España (1689).
Adolfo Zaldívar, Chilean politician
Andrés Zaldívar, Chilean politician
Ángel Zaldívar, Mexican football player
Juan de Zaldívar (1514–1570), Spanish official and explorer in New Spain. 
Juan de Zaldivar (Spanish soldier), (c. 1570-1598), Spanish soldier, killed by Indians. 
Vicente de Zaldivar (c. 1573-before 1650), Spanish soldier.
Juan Carlos Zaldívar, filmmaker, video artist
Rafael Zaldívar, former President of El Salvador
Roberto Zaldívar, Argentine physician
Ambrosio Zaldívar, Cuban Paralympic athlete 400 meters

Basque-language surnames